Gene Adam Brucker (October 15, 1924 – July 9, 2017) was an American historian and the Shepard Professor of History, Emeritus at the University of California, Berkeley. Brucker studied at Oxford and received his Ph.D. from Princeton University in 1954. He was immediately appointed to the faculty at Berkeley. He received several academic awards, including the Rhodes Scholarship, Fulbright Fellowship, Guggenheim Fellowship, and the National Endowment for the Humanities Fellowship. In 1979, he was elected to the American Academy of Arts and Sciences.

Brucker has focused and written specifically on Florence during the Renaissance. His research on Florentine history has  pursued new insights into the period. Among his works include "Renaissance Florence" (1983), "Florence: the Golden Age" (1998), and "Living on the Edge in Leonardo's Florence: Selected Essays."

References 

1924 births
2017 deaths
Historians of Italy
Historians of the Renaissance
Historians from Illinois
People from McLean County, Illinois
University of California, Berkeley College of Letters and Science faculty
Princeton University alumni
Fellows of the Medieval Academy of America
Alumni of the University of Oxford
American expatriates in England
Historians from California
Corresponding Fellows of the British Academy